Entomobryidae, sometimes called "slender springtails", is a family of springtails characterised by having an enlarged fourth abdominal segment and a well-developed furcula. Species in this family may be heavily scaled and can be very colourful.  The scale-less Entomobryidae are commonly caught in pitfall traps around the planet, and also occur in canopy faunas high up in trees (notably Entomobrya nivalis, very common throughout Europe if not the Northern Hemisphere). There are more than 1700 described species in Entomobryidae.

Genera
These 38 genera belong to the family Entomobryidae:

 Acanthurella Börner, 1906 g
 Acrocyrtus Yosii, 1959 g
 Amazhomidia g
 Americabrya Mari Mutt & Palacios-vargas, 1987 b
 Aphysa Handschin, 1925 g
 Ascocyrtus Yosii, 1963 g
 Australotomurus Stach, 1947 g
 Bessoniella Deharveng & Thibaud, 1989 g
 Calx b
 Coecobrya Yosii, 1956 c g b
 Corynothrix Tullberg, 1876 i c g
 Dicranocentrus Schött, 1893 g
 Drepanura Schoett, 1891 c g b
 Entomobrya Rondani, 1861 i c g b
 Entomobryoides Maynard, 1951 g b
 Epimetrura Schött, 1925 g
 Haloentomobrya Stach, 1963 g
 Hawinella Bellinger & Christiansen, 1974 i c g
 Heteromurus Wankel, 1860 i c g b
 Homidia Börner, 1906 g b
 Janetschekbrya Yosii, 1971 i c g
 Lepidobrya c g
 Lepidocyrtoides Schött, 1917 g
 Lepidocyrtus Bourlet, 1839 i c g b
 Lepidosira c g
 Mesentotoma b
 Orchesella Templeton, 1758 i c g b
 Orchesellides Bonet, 1930 i c g
 Permobrya Riek, 1976 g
 Pseudosinella Schaeffer, 1897 i c g b
 Rhynchocyrtus de Mendoça & Fernandes, 2007 g
 Seira Lubbock, 1869 i c g b
 Sinella Brook, 1882 i c g b
 Sinelloides Bonet, 1942 g
 Sinhomidia Zhang, 2009 g
 Tyrannoseira Bellini & Zeppelini, 2011 g
 Verhoeffiella Absolon, 1900 i g
 Willowsia Shoebotham, 1917 i c g b

Data sources: i = ITIS, c = Catalogue of Life, g = GBIF, b = Bugguide.net

References

External links

 
 
 
 

Collembola
Arthropod families